Anthony or Tony Nelson may refer to:

 Anthony Nelson (politician) (born 1948), British Conservative politician
 Anthony Nelson (musician) (born 1975), Gospel Musician
 Anthony Nelson (boxer) (born 1985), English boxer
 Anthony Nelson (footballer) (born 1997), Caymanian footballer
 Anthony Nelson (American football), American football player for the Tampa Bay Buccaneers
 Tony Nelson (footballer) (1930–2022), Welsh former footballer
 Tony Nelson (hurdler) (born 1950), Canadian Olympic hurdler
 Tony Nelson (I Dream of Jeannie), a character in the TV series I Dream of Jeannie

See also